, also known as Studio Trigger, is a Japanese animation studio founded by former Gainax employees Hiroyuki Imaishi and Masahiko Ōtsuka in 2011. It has produced anime works including Kill la Kill (2013), Little Witch Academia (short films, 2013 and 2015; TV series, 2017), Promare (2019), BNA: Brand New Animal (2020), and Cyberpunk: Edgerunners (2022).

Business
Studio Trigger was founded by former Gainax employee Hiroyuki Imaishi, following his success with Gurren Lagann (2007). This led to the creation of Studio Trigger, with Gurren Laganns visual humor and style defining the studio's work, and Trigger being seen as a successor to Gainax.

Studio Trigger was established on August 22, 2011 by Hiroyuki Imaishi and Masahiko Ōtsuka shortly after leaving Gainax. The studio name and official website was revealed in October 2011. Along with assisting production on various series, Trigger has released a short film, Little Witch Academia, and has developed its first original anime television series, Kill la Kill, which aired from October 2013 to March 2014. On July 8, 2013, Trigger launched a Kickstarter project in order to fund a second episode of Little Witch Academia. The project was well received and achieved its goal of $150,000 in under five hours, and went on to raise a total of $625,518.

Studio Trigger, along with studios Sanzigen and Ordet, joined joint holding company Ultra Super Pictures.

In 2018, Studio Trigger created a Patreon with the goal of acquiring necessary funding for projects and merchandise. They offer both a US$1 and US$5 option for patrons (including a limited US$80 tier that ships a drawing to the patron) and currently have over 1900 backers on the platform, raising over US$5000 per month.

Productions

Anime television series

Anime films

Original net animations

Other productions

References

External links
 
Trigger Inc. on Twitter 

 
Japanese animation studios
Mass media companies established in 2011
Japanese companies established in 2011
Animation studios in Tokyo
Ultra Super Pictures
Suginami